Beck is an unincorporated community in Covington County, Alabama, United States.

History
The community was likely named for the Beck family, who lived in the area. A post office operated under the name Beck from 1898 to 1904. Beck was once home to a general store, gristmill, and automotive garage.

References

Unincorporated communities in Covington County, Alabama
Unincorporated communities in Alabama